Simon Needham (born 10 October 1959) is a British archer. He competed in the men's individual event at the 2000 Summer Olympics.

References

External links
 

1959 births
Living people
British male archers
Olympic archers of Great Britain
Archers at the 2000 Summer Olympics
Sportspeople from Plymouth, Devon